Globočdol is a small settlement in the Municipality of Mirna Peč in southeastern Slovenia. The area is part of the historical region of Lower Carniola and is now included in the Southeast Slovenia Statistical Region.

References

External links
Globočdol on Geopedia

Populated places in the Municipality of Mirna Peč